Xóchitl Montes de Oca Rodríguez (born 27 December 1971) is a Mexican politician from the National Action Party. In 2012 she served as Deputy of the LXI Legislature of the Mexican Congress representing the State of Mexico.

References

1971 births
Living people
Politicians from the State of Mexico
Women members of the Chamber of Deputies (Mexico)
National Action Party (Mexico) politicians
21st-century Mexican politicians
21st-century Mexican women politicians
Deputies of the LXI Legislature of Mexico
Members of the Chamber of Deputies (Mexico) for the State of Mexico